Vithalapur is a village in Koppal district of Karnataka, India.

References

Villages in Koppal  district